Kestřany is a municipality and village in Písek District in the South Bohemian Region of the Czech Republic. It has about 700 inhabitants.

Administrative parts

Villages of Lhota u Kestřan and Zátaví are administrative parts of Kestřany.

Etymology
The name Kestřany is probably derived from Kestra, which was the name of the first settler. His name has origin in kostra, meaning "skeleton".

Geography
The southwestern part of the municipal territory with the Kestřany village lies České Budějovice Basin, the northeastern part lies in the Tábor Uplands.

The Otava River flows through the municipality. The territory is rich in ponds. The largest pond in Řežabinec, a part of the Řežabinec a Řežabinecké tůně National Nature Monument.

History
The first written mention of the Horní Fortress is from 1315, the first written mention of Kestřany is from 1338.

Climate

Sights

Kestřany is known for a complex of two gothic fortresses and one early baroque castle. The fortresses were built in the 13th century and the castle was added in 1651. Only the Horní Fortress is open to the public, but these monuments are gradually repaired and their opening is planned for the future.

References

External links

Villages in Písek District